Leucoagaricus tricolor is a species of mushroom producing fungus in the family Agaricaceae.

Taxonomy 
It was described in 1989 by the German mycologist Rolf Singer who classified it as Leucoagaricus tricolor.

Description 
Leucoagaricus tricolor is a small dapperling mushroom with thin whitish flesh.

Cap: 6mm wide and convex. The surface is purple with a paler margin and a purple fibrillose coating. Gills: Crowded, free, pale grey drying to brown-grey. Stem: 14cm long and 0.6mm thick. The surface is white with a powdery (pruinose) coating. The stem ring is white and also pruinose. Spores: Ellipsoidal with a double wall and obvious germ pore. Dextrinoid. (7.5) 8.2-9 x 4.5-5.2 μm. Basidia: 24-27 x 7.5-9.5μm. Four spored.

Habitat and distribution 
The specimens studied by Singer were found growing on clay soil in the tropical forests of Brazil, 30km North of Manaus.

References 

tricolor
Fungi described in 1989
Fungi of South America
Taxa named by Rolf Singer